GigaWing Generations, released in Japan as , is a 2004 vertically scrolling shooter arcade game developed by Takumi and published by Taito on their Taito Type X arcade system board. It was ported to the PlayStation 2 console in 2005.

Gameplay 
Gameplay continues from Giga Wing and Giga Wing 2. Generations has no characters to pilot the 4 selectable planes and no storyline. Each ship varies in ability more drastically than they do in previous Giga Wing games including flight speed and shot type. The player now selects which stage (out of two) to tackle first (in previous Giga Wings the plane choice affected the starting stage). The distinctive Reflect Force attack remains a major part of gameplay, though the new Reflect Laser from Giga Wing 2 was removed for Generations. A major addition is the ability to gain additional points from defeating enemies at close range. Generations is also the first and only Takumi scrolling shooter to use a vertically-oriented monitor (with standard player-controlled vertical scrolling).

In 2-player mode, both player shares the same multiplier, which allows players to reach score levels otherwise impossible to achieve in single player mode.

Ports
The later PlayStation 2 version added score attack mode, and the ability to change monitor settings. Strangely, the framerate of the PlayStation 2 port is lower than the arcade game. This version was released in Japan and Europe.

External links
Takumi GWG site: Arcade, PS2
Taito site (PS2)

2004 video games
2005 video games
2006 video games
Arcade video games
Multiplayer and single-player video games
PlayStation 2 games
Taito arcade games
Takumi Corporation games
Vertically scrolling shooters
Video games developed in Japan